The Federated Auto Parts 300 is a discontinued NASCAR Nationwide Series race that took place at Nashville Superspeedway. The race was one of two races held at the track, which received a second date on the then-Busch Series schedule one year after the track opened. Traditionally run in early June since its 2002 inception, the race moved to late July in 2011 as part of a schedule realignment.

Past winners

2005: Race postponed from Saturday to Sunday due to rain.

Multiple winners (drivers)

Multiple winners (teams)

Manufacturer wins

See also
Tennessee Lottery 250 – Current Xfinity race at the track
Rackley Roofing 200 – Current Truck Series race at the track

References

External links

Former NASCAR races
NASCAR Xfinity Series races